"Terror" is the second episode of the third series of British television sitcom, Bottom. It was first broadcast on 13 January 1995.

Synopsis
The episode begins in the flat's kitchen, where Richie is at the stove cooking a sausage that is on fire as Eddie brings in the morning paper. They both are disappointed to learn that they did not win the paper's "Spot the Ball" competition. Eddie then goes to answer a knock at the front door, and is greeted by three boys dressed in devil costumes playing trick or treat. Eddie denies the boys any sweets because he believes it is a "set-up". The boys respond to Eddie's actions by ramming a toy trident into his crotch. Meanwhile, Richie concocts a drink to cure Eddie of his DT's. Eddie faints after consuming the drink through his nose, and manages to knock Richie out with the trident still rammed in his crotch.

Realising that it is Halloween, Richie forms a plan; he and Eddie will go trick-or-treating to raise money for a party which will feature, in Richie's words, "plenty of booze and jugged-up babes, shaggy-shaggy-shag!" They go down to the local costume shop, where Richie returns wearing a devil outfit and Eddie ends up dressed up in a giant banana costume because there are no pumpkin outfits left. To make sure that people give them money, Richie asks Eddie to bring along an electric cattle prod; unfortunately, when Richie tries to use it, the electricity arcs back and causes Richie to soil himself, ruining one of his three pairs of tights.

Later on, Richie and Eddie arrive at Chief Mangosuthu Buthelezi Cul-de-Sac for further trick-or-treating. Eddie then spots the three boys that had speared him earlier in the episode, and Richie suggests that he and Eddie beat the boys up and take their sweets. However it's the young boys that beat up Richie and Eddie, and take 20 pence "from the incontinent girl" and five bottles of Malibu Rum "from the banana". Determined to press on, Richie knocks on the door of the next house they come to, which turns out to be owned by Eddie's friend Spudgun. When it turns out that he does not even know what trick-or-treating is, Richie orders Eddie to zap him with the cattle prod. Eddie misinterprets the request however and zaps Richie instead, causing Richie to soil himself again. After changing his tights for the second time, Richie takes the cattle prod and tries to zap Spudgun, only for the electricity to arc back on himself again, resulting in his final pair of tights being ruined. A humiliated Richie then changes his plan and tells Spudgun that he and Eddie are having a party that night, but everyone has to put in some money for drinks. Spudgun gives Eddie £2.50, and Richie tells Spudgun to invite everyone he knows.

While preparing for the party, Eddie creates a homebrew and batch of exploding carrots, and Richie creates snacks called Sprouts Mexicane. Richie tries to prove that they are safe to eat, but passes out immediately after eating one, and awakes an hour and a half later, now (unknowingly) shooting flames out of his backside whenever he breaks wind. Spudgun arrives, but it turns out that Dave Hedgehog is the only person he knows apart from Richie and Eddie, and Richie's planned "shagathon" ends up reduced to the four sitting around and drinking Eddie's highly corrosive homebrew. While Eddie, Spudgun, and Hedgehog do not mind this, Richie is sorely disappointed, and goes on a rant against God, claiming that he would be better off selling his soul to the Devil for a 25-year sex session. This gives him the idea to try and call up the Devil in a half-hearted Satanic ritual with the other three serving as his acolytes. Richie forces the others to eat his sprouts as an offering to the Devil, then does so himself, and they all pass out.

The four wake up some time later (now all with flaming flatulence), and on the stroke of midnight hear a knocking noise from the front door. Richie answers it with some apprehension, and finds a teenage girl named Doreen wearing a Halloween Devil's mask, causing Richie to think that she is the Devil. He invites her in and asks for twenty-five years of non-stop sex in exchange for giving her his earthly soul. Richie tells Eddie to offer Doreen some of his blood to drink as it is "90 percent proof". Reacting to the increasingly strange situation, Doreen then removes her mask and reveals herself as Dave's daughter. She has been sent by her mother to find out why her father is out so late. Eddie cuts his wrist and blood starts rapidly shooting out, and Dave grabs a glass to get the devil's drink only to stop when he recognises his daughter – and then asks her if she had any "tips for the 3:30 at Chepstow". Spudgun farts fire while a blood-soaked Eddie collapses into unconsciousness. Spudgun breaks wind again and the episode ends with the jet of flame from his rear end detonating the box of explosive carrots Eddie had prepared earlier.

Cast 
 Rik Mayall – Richard Richard
 Adrian Edmondson – Eddie Hitler
 Steve O'Donnell – Spudgun
 Christopher Ryan – Dave Hedgehog
 Lisa Coleman – Doreen Hedgehog
 Paul 'Des' Ballard, Mohammed George and Simon Coray – Small Devils

Cultural references
 The beverage that Richie makes to cure Eddie's DT's consists of seven eggs, washing-up liquid, Domestos, Jif Micro Liquid and ant spray. Richie sings, "Jif Micro Liquid, where are you?" in reference to a TV advert at the time.

Consistency errors
Richie, Eddie, Hedgehog and Spudgun are expecting a visit from the Devil. They all become nervous when they find out the Devil drinks virgin's blood. However, in previous episodes, Eddie has mentioned that he has had sex with several girls (Ethel Cardew in "'S Up," Lady Natasha in "Digger," and two casual girlfriends, one of whom 'works in Sketchley's on a Saturday afternoon,' the other who lives in Chiswick, in "'S Out") and Hedgehog even has a daughter – who appears in this very episode when she is mistaken for the Devil.
When Richie is about to go and get his Ladybird Book of Witchcraft to construct a pentangle, the scene switches to Eddie, Spudgun, and Hedgehog. Eddie can clearly be seen holding his laughter in from a blooper from the previous scene.

Editing errors
After Richie and Eddie set off to go trick or treating, the shot cuts to a pan-down shot to the two men walking down the street. When it cuts to there, there is an awkward pause usually filled by the scene change music.

References

External links

1995 British television episodes
Bottom (TV series)
Halloween television episodes